Meydanak (also Romanized as Meydānak and Maidanak) is a village in Nesa Rural District, Asara District, Karaj County, Alborz Province, Iran. At the 2006 census, its population was 20, in 7 families.

References 

Populated places in Karaj County